Appleton's Pulpit is a historic landmark in Saugus, Massachusetts, United States. It is the location where Major Samuel Appleton is said to have made a speech denouncing the tyranny of Colonial Governor Sir Edmund Andros.

Speech
On September 19, 1687, a warrant was issued for the arrest of Samuel Appleton of Ipswich, Dudley Bradstreet of Andover, and Nathaniel Saltonstall of Haverhill for being "persons factiously and seditiously inclined, and disaffected to his Majesty's government". Two additional warrants were issued on October 3 and October 5. It is believed that during this time, Appleton hid in the home of his son, Colonel Samuel Appleton, who owned the Saugus Iron Works property (in what was then part of Lynn, Massachusetts). While there, Appleton, according to tradition, delivered an address from a rocky cliff near the Iron Works in which he denounced the tyranny of Andros. The place where he is said to have delivered the speech became known as Appleton's Pulpit.

Accuracy
In Ipswich in the Massachusetts Bay Colony, Thomas Franklin Waters disputed the traditional account of events. The October 5 warrant was issued for Samuel Appleton of Lynn for hiding from officers of the law. While it could be inferred that Samuel Appleton was hiding in Lynn and the warrant specified "Samuel Appleton of Lynn" to ensure his arrest, Appleton would testify in his sworn deposition that he was arrested on September 20 and remained in custody until his ultimate release. Therefore, the October 5 warrant was likely for his son, also named Samuel Appleton, who lived in Lynn from 1680 to 1688. Waters also stated that it is improbable that a fugitive from justice would openly harangue the public from a high ledge. However, if the event did take place, Waters contended that it was the younger Appleton who delivered the speech.

Historical markers
Thomas Gold Appleton, a descendant of Samuel Appleton, had a tablet about two and a half feet square fastened to the perpendicular face of the cliff, just below where the speech is supposed to have been made.  It was formally presented to the Town of Saugus in March 1882. The tablet read 

In 1930, the Massachusetts Bay Colony Tercentenary Commission erected a number of historical markers around the state. Appleton's Pulpit was one of nine sites in Saugus the commission chose to place a marker, which reads

References

Historic sites in Massachusetts
Buildings and structures in Saugus, Massachusetts
Appleton family